Paskuwal Handi Tharindu Kaushal (born 5 March 1993) is a professional Sri Lankan cricketer who plays for ODIs and Tests in international level. He is a right-arm off break bowler who also bats right-handed. He is a past student of Devapathiraja College, Rathgama.

Domestic career
He domestically plays for Nondescripts Cricket Club in domestic arena. He made his List A debut for the club in December 2012 against Colts Cricket Club. In October 2020, he was drafted by the Colombo Kings for the inaugural edition of the Lanka Premier League. In July 2022, he was signed by the Galle Gladiators for the third edition of the Lanka Premier League.

International career
He made his Test match debut for Sri Lanka against New Zealand on 26 December 2014.

Kaushal made his One Day International debut for Sri Lanka against South Africa on 18 March 2015 in the quarter-finals of the 2015 Cricket World Cup. He got a chance as a replacement for the injured Rangana Herath.

Kaushal replaced injured Dilruwan Perera for the second test against Pakistan. He was a real headache for the Pakistani batsmen from the very first over and finally he took his first 5-wicket haul by taking 5 for 42 runs.
 
Kaushal's second five wicket haul came against India at Galle on 13 August 2015. Sri Lanka was in desperate trouble in the match, where their spearhead Rangana Herath along with Kaushal destroyed the India's second innings to just 112 runs. Herath took 7 wickets and Kaushal took rest of the 3 wickets. Sri Lanka finally won the match by 63 runs.

Bowling action
Kaushal's bowling action is slightly similar to legendary fellow Sri Lankan spinner Muttiah Muralitharan. Instead of being usual off-spinners, Kaushal is actually a wrist spinner as Murali. After the Test series against India in 2015, his bowling action has an illegal suspect action and ICC has given a period for checking his action in Chennai. After the study, Sri Lanka's chairman of selectors Kapila Wijegunawardene stated that, the off-spin of Kaushal is legal to bowl, but not the doosra. Doosra should be inside the ICC's 15-degree limit, which is not with Kaushal. So, Kaushal is banned for bowling doosra in international level.

References

External links
 

1993 births
Living people
Sri Lankan cricketers
Sri Lanka Test cricketers
Sri Lanka One Day International cricketers
Cricketers at the 2015 Cricket World Cup
Nondescripts Cricket Club cricketers
Sportspeople from Galle
Kurunegala Warriors cricketers
Colombo Stars cricketers